Juan García (2 July 1926 – 24 December 2003) was a Cuban basketball player. He competed in the men's tournament at the 1948 Summer Olympics and the 1952 Summer Olympics.

References

External links
 

1926 births
2003 deaths
Cuban men's basketball players
Olympic basketball players of Cuba
Basketball players at the 1948 Summer Olympics
Basketball players at the 1952 Summer Olympics
Place of birth missing